VHC Šviesa  is a handball club from Vilnius, Lithuania. Currently, the club is competing in Lithuanian Handball League.

They have won the LHL once, in 2021.

Team 
2021 season:
  Karolis Antanavičius
  Valdas Drabavičius
  Šarūnas Ugianskis
  Laurynas Palevičius
  Skirmantas Plėta
  Artūras Švilpa
  Karolis Blouvas
  Tadas Rasakevičius
  Rosvaldas Ramunis
  Tomas Bernatavičius
  Taurintas Markiavičius
  Eimantas Sinkevičius
  Domantas Pukas
  Ignas Jonuška
  Mantas Urvikis
  Karolis Antonovičius
  Modestas Adomėnas
  Edmundas Pelėda
  Domantas Jonušauskas
  Mantas Pranckevičius

Accomplishments

LHL:1st
2020–21, 2021–22

Notable players
 Gintaras Savukynas
 Vytautas Žiūra

References 

Lithuanian handball clubs
Sport in Vilnius
Lithuanian Handball League clubs